La Chapelle-Blanche may refer to:
 La Chapelle-Blanche, Côtes-d'Armor, France
 La Chapelle-Blanche, Savoie, France
 La Chapelle-Blanche-Saint-Martin, Indre-et-Loire, France

See also 
 La Chapelle (disambiguation)